The Noise of Trouble: Live in Tokyo is the second live album by the free jazz group Last Exit. It was released in 1986 by Enemy Records.

Reception

In a review for AllMusic, Steve Huey wrote: "the group's interplay was pretty well-honed by this point, comfortable enough that they could welcome guests for some of the Tokyo performances... Shorter, free-form sound explorations... alternate with longer, freely improvised jams highlighting the group's uncanny feel for smooth transitions... For listeners attuned to such extreme sounds, The Noise of Trouble is intoxicating in its raw, undiluted power and total disregard for propriety, not to mention the musicians' mastery of improvisational communication."

Stuart Nicholson commented: "Everyone was at the top of their game, musically, conceptually and creatively, something that was underlined by their total confidence in each other's playing... Recorded live... on the heels of a successful European tour, Last Exit brought spontaneity, energy and a collective empathy that working regularly together brings."

Writing for Trouser Press, Greg Kot stated: "the restless quartet flies from traditional blues motifs to high-energy skronk and back again with dexterity and daring."

Track listing

Personnel 

Last Exit
Peter Brötzmann – baritone saxophone, tenor saxophone, tárogató, cover art
Ronald Shannon Jackson – drums, voice
Bill Laswell – Fender 6-string bass
Sonny Sharrock – guitar
Additional musicians
Herbie Hancock – piano
Akira Sakata – alto saxophone, soprano clarinet

Technical personnel
Yukihiro Fukuda – assistant engineer
Mitsuharu Kobayashi – mastering
Last Exit – producer
Robert Musso – mixing
Seigen Ono – engineering

Release history

References

External links 
 The Noise of Trouble: Live in Tokyo at Bandcamp
 

1986 live albums
Last Exit (free jazz band) albums
Enemy Records live albums